= Willowild =

- Location within Gauteng Location within South Africa
- Coordinates: 26.095°S 28.021°E
- Country: South Africa
- Province: Gauteng
- Municipality: City of Johannesburg
- Main Place: Sandton

Area
  - Total: 0.34 km^{2} (0.13 sq mi)

Population (2011)
  - Total: 348
  - Density: 1,000/km^{2} (2,700/sq mi)

Racial makeup (2011)
  - Black African: 24.6%
  - Coloured: 2.6%
  - Indian/Asian: 3.4%
  - White: 67.0%
  - Other: 2.3%

First languages (2011)
  - English: 67.7%
  - Afrikaans: 9.2%
  - Tswana: 6.3%
  - Xhosa: 4.6%
  - Other: 12.1%
- Time zone: UTC+2 (SAST)
- Postal code (street): 2196

Willowild is a suburb of Johannesburg, South Africa. It is located in Region B of the City of Johannesburg Metropolitan Municipality. Willowild was originally a farm and dates from at least the early 20th century. The farm was subdivided and plots were sold off for residential development in 1970, leaving the original farmhouse on one of the plots.
